The first hoax reported in Singapore was in 1805, when the Bukit Timah Monkey Man was reported for the first time. Depending on the subject and type of the hoax, it's been reported to Singapore Police Force, there maybe an investigation by the Criminal Investigation Department and subsequently a possible a stern warning or prosecution by the AGC.

Hoaxes 
 1805: Bukit Timah Monkey Man, commonly abbreviated as BTM or BTMM, is a cryptid said to inhabit Singapore
 1910: Dreadnought hoax, Royal Navy officers are reported as taking revenge, in the Singapore Free Press and Mercantile Advertiser.
 2005: National Kidney Foundation Singapore scandal, also known as the NKF saga, NKF scandal, or NKF controversy.
 2015: Death Hoax, on 18 March 2015, a Death hoax website reported false news of Lee Kuan Yew death (first prime minister of Singapore).
 2015: 2015 Voluntary non-work day, Ministry of Manpower (Singapore), MOM lodges police report as a Hoax post appeared on social media.
 2015: NTUC FairPrice warns netizens about fake $100 coupon on Facebook

See also 
 List of email scams
 List of hoaxes
 Chemtrail conspiracy theory
 Murphy's law

References 

 
Internet hoaxes
Hoaxes
Finance fraud